In numerical mathematics, the Uzawa iteration is an algorithm for solving saddle point problems. It is named after Hirofumi Uzawa  and was originally introduced in the context of concave programming.

Basic idea 
We consider a saddle point problem of the form

 

where  is a symmetric positive-definite matrix.

 

where  denotes the Schur complement.
Since  is symmetric positive-definite, we can apply standard iterative methods like the gradient descent
method or the conjugate gradient method to

 

in order to compute .
The vector  can be reconstructed by solving

 

It is possible to update  alongside  during the iteration for the Schur complement system and thus obtain an efficient algorithm.

Implementation 

We start the conjugate gradient iteration by computing the residual

 

of the Schur complement system, where

 

denotes the upper half of the solution vector matching the initial guess  for its lower half. We complete the initialization by choosing the first search direction

 

In each step, we compute

 

and keep the intermediate result

 

for later.
The scaling factor is given by

 

and leads to the updates

 

Using the intermediate result  saved earlier, we can also update the upper part of the solution vector

 

Now we only have to construct the new search direction by the Gram–Schmidt process, i.e.,

 

Modifications and extensions 
If solving the linear system  exactly is not feasible, inexact solvers can be applied.

If the Schur complement system is ill-conditioned, preconditioners can be employed to improve the speed of convergence of the underlying gradient method.

Inequality constraints can be incorporated, e.g., in order to handle obstacle problems.

References

Further reading 
 

Numerical analysis